Total Theatre Awards were first presented in 1997 and are given annually at the Edinburgh Festival Fringe to companies excelling in devised theatre, live art, visual performance, mime, puppetry, physical theatre, experimental theatre, dance, clown, circus, street, immersive, outdoor, site specific performance. They are one of a number of awards open to companies/artists presenting work at the festival.

1997
Award for Most Innovative Overall Production: The Right Size – Do You Come Here Often?
Audience's Choice Award: Acrobat – Acrobat
Award for Most Innovative International Production: DEREVO – Red Zone
Award for Best Use of Design: Co Yvette Bozsik – Hommage à Mary Wigman
Award for Most Innovative Touring Production: Fecund Theatre – 27
Award for Best Newcomer: K486 – The Trial
Lifetime Achievement Award: Steven Berkoff

1999 
Award for Best Overall Production: Anonymous Society – Jacques Brel
 Award for Best Newcomer: Metro-Boulet-Dodo – Reunion
Award for Best British Production: Ridiculusmus – The Exhibitionists and Yes Yes Yes
Award for Best International Production: Theatre Talipot – The Water Carriers and Passage
Audience's Choice Award: No Ordinary Angels – Deadly
Award for Best Use of Design: the Young Vic Theatre Co – The Arabian Nights
Award for Most Supportive Venue: Continental Shifts at St Brides
Lifetime Achievement Award: Ken Campbell and Nola Rae

2000 
Ariel Teatr: A Little Requiem for Kantor
BlackSKYwhite: Bertrand's Toys
Generally Better Productions (latterly known as Theatre O): 3 Dark Tales
Shunt: The Balled of Bobby Francois
Spymonkey: Stiff - Undertaking Undertaking
Audience's Choice Award: Pig Iron Theatre Company – Poet in New York
Award for Most Supportive Venue: The Pleasance
Lifetime Achievement Award: Monika Pagneux

2002 
Compagnie Fiat Lux: Nouvelles Folies
Company F/Z: Throat
Nats Nus: Ful
Shona Reppe Puppets: Cinderella
Theatrum Botanicum – Go Go: The Boy with Magic Feet
Wishbone: Scapegoat
Award for Most Supportive Venue: Aurora Nova
Award for Outstanding Excellence and Innovation: DEREVO

2003 

 Akhe: White Cabin 
 Fabrik Company: Pandora 88 
 Deja Donne: There Where We Were 
 Eddie Ladd: Club Luz 
 Duckie: C'est Vauxhall 
 Blow-Up Theatre: The Illusion Brothers 
 Materiali Resistenti Dance Factory: Waterwall
 Award for Most Supportive Venue: Aurora St Stephens

2005 

 Andrew Dawson: Absence and Presence 
 Gecko Theatre: The Race 
 Grid Iron Theatre: The Devil's Larder 
 Kazuko Hohki: Evidence for the Existence of Borrowers 
 Dreamthinkspeak: Don't Look Back 
 Station House Opera: Roadmetal Sweetbread

2006 
Inspector Sands and Stamping Ground Theatre: Hysteria
NIE (New International Encounter): Past Half Remembered
Hoipolloi: Floating
Farm in the Cave: Sclavi / Song of an Emigrant
Award for Best Newcomer: Chotto Ookii Theatre Company – And Even My Goldfish
Award for Innovation: Will Adamsdale / Chris Branch – The Receipt
Award for Significant Contribution to Physical and Visual Theatre / Performance: Battersea Arts Centre

2007 
Award for Best Emerging Company: 1927 – Between the Devil and the Deep Blue Sea
Award for Best Original Work by a Collective / Ensemble: Rude Mechs in association with Erich Jungwirth and Richard Jordan Productions – Get Your War On
Award for Best Physical Performance: Sedari Movement Laboratory in association with AsiaNow Productions – Woyzeck
Award for Experimentation: Ontroerend Goed – The Smile Off Your Face
Award for Best Small Scale Work: News From Nowhere (Tim Crouch) and the Fruitmarket Gallery – England
Award for Significant Contribution: Jos Houben
Inaugural Wildcard Award: Precarious – Druthers

2008 
Award for Experiment and Innovation: Ontroerend Goed, Kopergiettery & Richard Jordon Productions – Once and For All We're Gonna Tell You Who We Are So Shut Up and Listen
Award for Graduate Company: Little Bulb Theatre – Crocosmia
Award for Story Theatre: Puppet State Theatre Company – The Man Who Planted Trees
Award for Visual Theatre: RedCape Theatre – The Idiot Colony
Award for Young Company: THE TEAM & National Theatre of Scotland Workshop – Architecting
Award for Significant Contribution to Physical and Visual Theatre: Footsbarn Touring Theatre

2009  

 Award for Emerging Artist / Company: The River People –  Lilly Through the Dark
 Award for Devised Performance: Beady Eye / Kristin Fredricksson –  Everything Must Go (Or the Voluntary Attempt to Overcome Unnecessary Obstacles)
 Award for Innovation / Interaction / Immersion: Adrian Howells –  Foot-Washing for the Sole
 Award for Physical and Visual Theatre: Clod Ensemble –  Under Glass
 Award for Music and Theatre: Dafydd James and Ben Lewis –  My Name is Sue
 Award for Significant Contribution to Theatre Making: Improbable Theatre

2010  

 Award for Emerging Artist / Company: Bryony Kimmings – Sex Idiot
 Award for Physical and Visual Theatre:
 Catherine Wheels – White
 NoFit State Circus – Tabu
 Award for Innovation:
 Cora Bissett, Ankur Productions / Pachamama Productions – Roadkill
 News From Nowhere / Tim Crouch – The Author
 Bootworks Theatre – 30 Days to Space
 Award for Significant Contribution to the Field of Total Theatre: David Bates

2011  

 Award for Emerging Artist / Company: ShadyJane – Sailing On
 Award for Physical / Visual / Devised Performance:
 Bunk Puppets and Scamp Theatre – Swamp Juice
 NeTTheatre / Grupa Coincidentia – Turandot
 Award for Innovation:
 Look Left Look Right – You Once Said Yes
 Adrian Howells – May I Have the Pleasure...?
 Tania El Khoury – Maybe if you choreograph me, you will feel better
 Award for Significant Contribution to the Field of Total Theatre: Judith Knight (Artsadmin)

2012  

 Award for Emerging Artist / Company: Charlotte De Bruyne & Nathalie Marie Verbeke, supported by Ontroerend Goed & Richard Jordan – XXXO
 Award for Physical / Visual / Devised Performance:
 Teatr Zar – Caesarean Section: Essays on Suicide 
 Res de Res – (remor)
 Award for Innovation, Experimentation & Playing with Form:
 Ontroerend Goed, Laika, Richard Jordan Productions – All That is Wrong 
 Rob Drummond – Bullet Catch 
 Soho Theatre and The Mason Sisters – Doctor Brown: Befrdfgth 
 Award for Significant Contribution to the Field of Total Theatre: Helen Lannaghan and Joseph Seelig, (London International Mime Festival)

2013 

 Award for Emerging Artist / Company: Sh!t Theatre – JSA (Job Seekers Anonymous) 2013
 Award for Physical / Visual / Devised Performance:
 Company Non Nova – L'Après-midi d'un Foehn (Version 1)
 Pirates of the Carabina – Flown
 Award for Innovation, Experimentation & Playing with Form:
 Berlin, Big in Belgium, Richard Jordan Productions – Bonanza
 Brokentalkers – Have I No Mouth
 Scottee – The Worst of Scottee
 Award for Significant Contribution to the Field of Total Theatre: C!rca

2014  

 Emerging Artist / Company Award: Touretteshero – Backstage in Biscuit Land
 Physical / Visual / Devised Performance Award: Geoff Sobelle – The Object Lesson
 Innovation, Experimentation & Playing with Form Award:
 Dead Centre – Lippy 
 Two Destination Language – Near Gone
 Circus Award: Underbelly Productions in association with Barely Methodical Troupe – Bromance:
 Judges Discretionary Awards:
 Wunderbaum, Red Cat, Big in Belgium, Richard Jordan Productions – Looking for Paul
 Kim Noble, Soho Theatre and David Johnson & John Mackay in association with ibt – You’re Not Alone
 Significant Contribution to the Field of Total Theatre Award: Ridiculusmus

2015  

 Emerging Artist / Company Award: Breach – The Beanfield
 Physical / Visual / Devised Performance Award: Al Seed – Oog
 Innovation, Experimentation & Playing with Form Award:
 Sue MacLaine and Nadia Nadarajah – Can I Start Again Please
 Volker Gerling – Portraits in Motion 
 Dance Award: Le Patin Libre – Vertical Influences 
 Circus Award: Palestinian Circus – B-Orders
 Significant Contribution to the Field of Total Theatre Award: Forced Entertainment

2016 

 Emerging Artist / Company Award:
 FK Alexander with Okishima Island Tourist Group Association – (I Could Go on Singing) Over the Rainbow
 Yinka Kuitenbrouwer, Big in Belgium, Richard Jordan Productions, Theatre Royal Plymouth – One Hundred Homes
 Physical / Visual / Devised Performance Award:
 Atelier Bildraum, Big in Belgium, Richard Jordan Productions, Theatre Royal Plymouth – Bildraum
 Nic Green with Rosana Cade and Laura Bradshaw – Cock and Bull  
 Innovation, Experimentation & Playing with Form Award: Hot Brown Honey with Briefs Factory – Hot Brown Honey  
 Dance Award: Mauro Paccagnella and Alessandro Bernardesch – Happy Hour 
 Circus Award: Ockham’s Razor and Turtle Key Arts – Ockham's Razor: Tipping Point
 Significant Contribution to the Field of Total Theatre Award: Forest Fringe

2017  

Emerging Artist / Company Award: YesYesNoNo – Five Encounters on a Site Called Craigslist 
Physical / Visual / Devised Performance Award: Gandini Juggling – Sigma 
Circus Award: Fauna – Fauna 
Innovation, Experimentation & Playing with Form Award:
Selina Thompson Ltd – Salt
Rachel Mars – Our Carnal Hearts
Bertrand Lesca & Nasi Voutsas – Palmyra
Dance Award: Oona Doherty – Hope Hunt and the Ascension into Lazarus 
Judges Discretionary Award: Liz Aggiss – Slap and Tickle 
Significant Contribution to the Field of Total Theatre Award: Lyn Gardner

2018  

 Emerging Artist / Company Award: Samira Elagoz in association with From Start to Finnish – Cock, Cock… Who’s There?
Physical / Visual / Devised Performance Award:
Lobke Leirens and Maxim Storms – Another One 
Chaliwaté Company and Focus Company – Backup 
Circus Award: Sharon Burgess Productions & A Good Catch – Casting Off 
Innovation, Experimentation & Playing with Form Award:
One Inch Badge – Pussy Riot: Riot Days
Natalie Palamides – Nate
Dance Award: V / DA and MHz, in association with Feral – Void 
Significant Contribution to the Field of Total Theatre Award: Le Gateau Chocolat

2019  

 Emerging Artist / Company Award: Travis Alabanza – Burgerz
Physical / Visual / Devised Performance Award: Julia Croft and Nisha Madhan with Zanetti Productions – Working On My Night Moves 
Circus Award:
Nikki & JD  – Knot 
Circumference  – Staged 
Innovation, Experimentation & Playing with Form Award:
Battersea Arts Centre and BAC Beatbox Academy – Frankenstein: How to Make a Monster
In Bed with My Brother – Tricky Second Album
Dance Award: Chiara Bersani – Seeking Unicorns 
Judges Discretionary Awards: 
Bertrand Lesca and Nasi Voutsas – The End 
Scottee & Friends – Fat Blokes 
Amy Bell – The Forecast 
Significant Contribution to the Field of Total Theatre Award: Jessica Brough (Fringe of Colour)

References

External links
Total Theatre Awards

 
Lists of theatre awards